Longguan may refer to the following locations in China:

 Longguan, Hebei (龙关镇), town in Chicheng County
 Longguan Township (龙观乡), Yinzhou District, Ningbo, Zhejiang